Manufacturing & Service Operations Management is a bi-monthly peer-reviewed academic journal established in 1999 that is published by the Institute for Operations Research and the Management Sciences. It covers analytical research about operations management in the manufacturing/service industry. According to the Journal Citation Reports, the journal has a 2019 impact factor of 4.281.

Over the first three quarters in 2020, the number of M&SOM downloads exceeded 100,000.

Editors-in-chief
The following persons are, or have been, editors-in-chief:
 2021-present: Georgia Perakis, MIT
2015–2020: Christopher S. Tang, UCLA
 2009–2014: Stephen C. Graves, MIT
 2005–2009: Gérard Cachon, UPenn
 2003–2005: Garrett J. van Ryzin, Columbia University
 1999–2003: Leroy Schwarz, Purdue University

References

External links

Business and management journals
Quarterly journals
INFORMS academic journals
English-language journals
Publications established in 1999